Liechtenstein competed at the 1968 Winter Olympics in Grenoble, France.

Alpine skiing

Men

Men's slalom

Women

Luge

Men

References
Official Olympic Reports
 Olympic Winter Games 1968, full results by sports-reference.com

Nations at the 1968 Winter Olympics
1968
1968 in Liechtenstein